Dionaea muscipula 'Fused Tooth' is a cultivar of Dionaea muscipula, the Venus flytrap. It has webbed teeth that appear in the summer.

External links
http://www.carnivorousplants.org/cpn/Species/v33n4p100_101.html
http://cpphotofinder.com/dionaea-fused-tooth-439.html

Dionaea cultivars